The 2020 Aragon motorcycle Grand Prix (officially known as the Gran Premio Michelin de Aragón) was the eleventh round of the 2020 Grand Prix motorcycle racing season and the tenth round of the 2020 MotoGP World Championship. It was held at the Ciudad del Motor de Aragón in Alcañiz on 18 October 2020.

Background

Impact of the COVID-19 pandemic 
The opening rounds of the 2020 championship have been heavily affected by the COVID-19 pandemic. The Aragon Grand Prix, scheduled in the original calendar on October 4 as the sixteenth race of the season, was brought forward by a week following the initial postponement of the Thailand Grand Prix (later cancelled on July 31) on the first Sunday in October (the Thailand stage was initially scheduled for 22 March as the second leg of the championship). Several Grands Prix were cancelled or postponed after the aborted opening round in Qatar, prompting the Fédération Internationale de Motocyclisme to draft a new calendar. A new calendar based exclusively in Europe was announced on 11 June. The race in Aragon was placed on 18 October as the tenth GP of the season.

MotoGP Championship standings before the race 
After the ninth round at the 2020 French Grand Prix, Fabio Quartararo leads the drivers' championship with 115 points, with a 5-point advantage over Joan Mir. Andrea Dovizioso is third with 97 points, one more than Maverick Viñales, while Takaaki Nakagami is fifth with 81 points.

In the manufacturers' standings, Yamaha leads with 170 points, ahead of Ducati with 151 points. KTM is third with 125 points, seven more than Suzuki. Honda is fifth with 99 points and Aprilia closes the standings with 32 points.

In the team championship, Petronas Yamaha SRT is first with 196 points, followed by Team Suzuki Ecstar and Ducati Team with 165 and 161 points respectively. Monster Energy Yamaha is fourth with 154 points, KTM Factory Racing is fifth with 135 points.

MotoGP Entrants 

 Stefan Bradl replaced Marc Márquez for the eighth straight race while he recovered from injuries sustained in his opening round crash.
 Valentino Rossi tested positive for the SARS-CoV-2 virus on 15 October, requiring him to quarantine for a minimum of 10 days according to Italian law and forcing him to miss the Aragon and Teruel rounds. Yamaha confirmed that they would not field a replacement for Rossi at the Teruel round on 25 October. 
 As Rossi and Marc Márquez missed the race, it was the first time since the 1999 Rio de Janeiro Grand Prix that no current or former premier class champion lined up on the grid.

Free practice

MotoGP 
In the first session Maverick Viñales was the fastest ahead of Franco Morbidelli and Fabio Quartararo. The Spaniard confirmed his first position in the second session, while the Petronas Yamaha SRT bikers swapped positions. In the third session Morbidelli was the fastest ahead of Cal Crutchlow and Pol Espargaró.

Race

MotoGP

Moto2

Moto3

Championship standings after the race
Below are the standings for the top five riders, constructors, and teams after the round.

MotoGP

Riders' Championship standings

Constructors' Championship standings

Teams' Championship standings

Moto2

Riders' Championship standings

Constructors' Championship standings

Teams' Championship standings

Moto3

Riders' Championship standings

Constructors' Championship standings

Teams' Championship standings

References

External links

Aragon
Aragon motorcycle Grand Prix
Aragon motorcycle Grand Prix
Aragon motorcycle Grand Prix
Aragon motorcycle Grand Prix